Thomas Lucas (c.1720–1784) was a British MP and West India merchant.

Thomas Lucas may also refer to:
Thomas Lucas (MP for Midhurst), MP for Midhurst in 1407
Thomas Lucas (MP for Southwark), MP for Southwark in 1421
Thomas Lucas (16th century MP), Member of Parliament for Colchester
Thomas Lucas (Royalist) (died 1649), officer fighting for the royalist cause in the English Civil War
Thomas Lucas (educator) (c. 1764–1838), founder of the Royal London Society for Blind People and developer of the Lucas tactile alphabet system
Thomas Lucas (1822–1902), first baronet of the Lucas baronets
Thomas Pennington Lucas (1843–1917), Scottish-born Australian medical practitioner, naturalist, author, philosopher and utopianist
Thomas Geoffry Lucas (1872–1947), English architect
Tommy Lucas (1895–1953), England footballer
Tom Lucas (trade unionist) (1876–after 1936), Welsh trade union leader
Thomas Lucas (cricketer) (1852-1945), Australian cricketer
Thomas Lucas (water polo) (born 1989), Dutch water polo player on the Netherlands men's national water polo team